Zhao Ruibao (born March 1960) is a lieutenant general (zhongjiang) of the People's Liberation Army (PLA) serving as director of the Political Work Department of the Western Theater Command, succeeding He Ping in 2017. He is a delegate to 13th National People's Congress.

Biography
Zhao was born in Yanzhou County (now Yanzhou District of Jining), Shandong, in March 1960. He served in the Second Artillery Corps for a long time before being appointed political commissar of PLA Rocket Force University of Engineering in October 2009. He became political commissar of the 51st Base in 2011 before being assigned to the similar position in the 52nd Base (later renamed 61st Base) in 2014. In April 2018, he became deputy political commissar of the Western Theater Command and director of the Political Work Department.

He was promoted to the rank of major general (shaojiang) in July 2010 and lieutenant general (zhongjiang) in June 2019.

References

1960 births
Living people
People from Jining
People's Liberation Army generals from Shandong
Delegates to the 13th National People's Congress